William Quick (19 April 1902 – July 1994) was a British water polo player. He competed in the men's tournament at the 1928 Summer Olympics.

See also
 Great Britain men's Olympic water polo team records and statistics
 List of men's Olympic water polo tournament goalkeepers

References

External links
 

1902 births
1994 deaths
Water polo goalkeepers
British male water polo players
Olympic water polo players of Great Britain
Water polo players at the 1928 Summer Olympics
Sportspeople from Cardiff